is a small town located in Kusu District, Ōita Prefecture, Japan. It promotes its nine onsen, which are occasionally closed due to flooding; it is also the summer headquarters of Labo Camp Kujū, part of the LABO language program.

Kokonoe consists mainly of farms, hot springs, and countryside tourist attractions.

As of March 2017, the town has an estimated population of 9,804 and the density of 36 persons per km². The total area is 271.37 km².

Geography 
Kokonoe is located within the western part of Oita, with most of the area is covered within the Aso Kujū National Park. Mount Kujū is located here with the Kusu River flowing through Kokonoe.

Neighbouring municipalities 

 Ōita Prefecture
 Taketa
 Yufu
 Kusu
 Kumamoto Prefecture
 Oguni
 Minamioguni

Transportation

Railway 

 JR Kyushu
 Kyūdai Main Line: Era - Hikiji - Bungo Nakamura - Noya

Highways 

 Ōita Expressway
 Japan National Routes
 Route 210
 Route 387

Relations 
Kokonoe have a sister city relationship with the city of Sasebo in Nagasaki since 26 July 1991.

Gallery

References

External links

 Kokonoe official website 

Towns in Ōita Prefecture